A Las Cinco En El Astoria  (Five O'Clock At The Astoria) is the fifth full-length album released by La Oreja de Van Gogh, their second album to receive a Grammy nomination, and the first with new lead vocalist Leire Martínez. It was released in three editions: CD, CD+T-shirt, and Digipack. According to "Promusicae", A las cinco en el Astoria was the 12th biggest selling album of 2008 in Spain.

Information
A las cinco en el Astoria is the first album to feature Leire Martínez as the lead singer, replacing Amaia Montero, who had left in 2007. The first song released was "El Último Vals". The single was produced by Nigel Walker and La Oreja de Van Gogh. All songs are composed by the current members of the band. The album received a 2009 Latin Grammy nomination for Best Pop Album by a Duo/Group With Vocals.

The song "Jueves" became one of the best-known songs by the band, as it was a tribute to the victims of 11 March 2004 attacks in Madrid.

Track listing

Singles

 El Ultimo Vals (2008)
 Inmortal (2008)
 Jueves (2008)
 Europa VII (2009)
 Más (2009) (Puerto Rico)

Chart performance

Sales and certifications

Awards

- Best Latin Album Pop 2009 A las cinco en el Astoria Nominated

References

2008 albums
La Oreja de Van Gogh albums